Elections for the House of Representatives in the Philippines were held on May 11, 1987. This was the first legislative election since 1984, the first House of Representatives elections since 1969, and the first election since the People Power Revolution that overthrew president Ferdinand Marcos and brought Corazon Aquino to power after alleged election fraud by the former during the 1986 presidential election against the latter.

Although no party surpassed 20% of the popular vote, candidates that ran under two or more parties won a quarter of the seats, followed by PDP–Laban and Lakas ng Bansa of subsequent speaker Ramon Mitra, Jr. that would later be the Laban ng Demokratikong Pilipino after some of the members of PDP–Laban defected. The Ferdinand Marcos loyalists either ran under the Kilusang Bagong Lipunan, as independents, or found their way into the pro-Corazon Aquino parties. The pro-Aquino parties won majority of the seats in the House of Representatives.

Under the provisions of the Constitution, the 8th Congress spanned for an unprecedented five years, from June 30, 1987 until June 30, 1992.

Results
The top bar represents seats won, while the bottom bar represents the proportion of votes received.

 Partido ng Bayan: 1.63%
 Sectoral seats: appointed

Note

C.  KBL Independents were absorbed by the Kilusang Bagong Lipunan. This led to the combination of their seats, giving them 114 seats.

See also
Commission on Elections
Politics of the Philippines
Philippine elections

References

  

1987
1987 elections in the Philippines